Syrian News Channel, also known as alikhbaria Syria or Al-Ikhbariyah Syria, is a state-run television station based in Damascus, Syria, launched in December 15, 2010. The channel is headed by Imad Sara.

Syrian News Channel during the Syrian crisis
On June 12, 2012, a car of the Syrian News Channel became the target of an armed attack by a group of gunmen in the town of Al-Haffa near the city of Latakia. Syrian News Channel correspondent Mazen Mohammad was hit in his hand while cameraman Fadi Yakoub was hit in his chest. Both journalists were immediately admitted to the National Hospital in Latakia. According to journalist Mazen Mohammad, an armed group opened fire towards their car while trying to cover the events in Al-Haffa near the National Hospital.

In the early morning of 27 June 2012, a group of gunmen attacked the main building of the Syrian News Channel in Damascus countryside. Three staff members of the Syrian News Channel and four security guards were killed during the attack on the headquarters of the TV station. The three killed staff members are, Zaid Kahel, Mohammad Shamma and Sami Abu Amin. The official Syrian Arab News Agency (SANA) announced that the assailants had also ransacked the offices of the TV station during the attack that was carried out at the early hours of the day. The assailants stormed the offices of Syrian News Channel, planted explosives in the studios and blew them up along with the equipment. Five buildings in the complex were destroyed in the attack. The attacks have been attributed to al Nusra, an al-Qaeda affiliated extremist group.

An armed group kidnapped on August 10, 2012, four team members of the Syrian News Channel in al-Tall area of Damascus Countryside. The crew members are, Journalist Yara Saleh, Cameraman Abdullah Tabreh, Cameraman Assistant Hatem Abu Yehya and the driver Hussam Imad. However, the armed forces freed the team seven days later. Three colleagues were released except of Hatem Abu Yehya who was killed by the armed groups.

On September 5, 2012, Syrian Television Channels broadcast were broken off on Arabsat and Nilesat, including Syrian News Channel.

On September 27, 2012, the Syrian News Channel was hijacked for about 90 seconds by unknown sides.

Mohammed al-Ashram, cameraman for Syrian News Channel was shot dead in the eastern province of Deir Ezzor on October 10, 2012.

President Bashar al-Assad gave an interview on April 17, 2013, to Syrian News Channel.

On 27 May 2013, Yara Abbas, a prominent female Syrian war reporter for the Syrian News Channel, was killed by rebels near the military air base of al-Dabaa in the central province of Homs. The cameraman Osama Dayoub and driver Badr Awad were injured in the attack.

Headquarters
A large studio in Drousha and a smaller studio, which can be hooked up to the headquarters for down-the-line interviews, is located in Gomarek Square in Damascus to accommodate live guests.

See also
 Television in Syria
 List of journalists killed during the Syrian civil war

References

External links
 Syrian News Channel live stream 
 
 
 

Arabic-language television stations
Television channels in Syria
Television channels and stations established in 2010
2010 establishments in Syria
Mass media in Damascus
State media